The Red Nation is a Native American advocacy group that focusses on decolonisation and anti-capitalism as means to liberate Indigenous peoples.

In 2021, in response to the Green New Deal, the group published the Red Deal, proposal designed to supplement the Green New Deal and place Indigenous peoples and their lands at the centre of climate change action.

Organization 
The Red Nation is a group of a Native American activists and scholars, including co-founder Nick Estes. The group is run entirely by volunteers. 

The group is based in Albuquerque, New Mexico. Its principles of unity were ratified on August 10, 2018.

Activities 
The group advocates for the abolition of borders. In 2021, responding to the Green New Deal, the group proposed the Red Deal, which states that the solution to the climate crisis must centre around Indigenous peoples and the land they should own. The group proposed the Red Deal as a set of additional steps that should be taken in addition to the Green New Deal proposals.

The Red Nation operate a podcast.

Selected publications 

 The Red Deal: Indigenous Action to Save Our Earth, 2021, Common Notions Press, (ISBN: 9781942173434)

References

External links 

 Official website

Organizations established in 2018
2018 establishments in New Mexico
Advocacy groups in the United States
Indigenous organisations in the United States